This is the progression of world record improvements of the high jump W35 division of Masters athletics.

Key

References

Masters Athletics High Jump list

Masters athletics world record progressions
High jump